The handball events at the 2006 Asian Games were held in Al-Rayyan, Qatar between 3 December and 14 December 2006. It was the seventh time handball was included at the Asian Games. All matches were held in the Al-Gharafa Indoor Hall.

Schedule

Medalists

Medal table

Draw
A draw ceremony was held on 7 September 2006 to determine the groups for the men's and women's competitions. The teams were seeded based on their final ranking at the 2002 Asian Games.

Men

Group A
 (6)
 (Host)

Group B
 (2)
 (7)

Group C
 (4)
 (8)

Group D
 (1)

Women

Group A
 (2)
 (3)

Group B
 (1)
 (4)

Final standing

Men

Women

References

Official website
Asian Games Handball Women, goalzz.com, retrieved 18 November 2006

 
A
2006
2006 Asian Games events
International handball competitions hosted by Qatar